Hinterschellenberg is a settlement in Schellenberg, Liechtenstein.

Geography
Hinterschellenberg is located in the town of Schellenberg, a few kilometres away from its downtown core.

Main sights
It is home to Liechtenstein's Russian monument.

References

External links

Austria–Liechtenstein border crossings